Jenny Raven is a Hong Kong born actress. She is known for her work on Kims Convenience as Gwen, Irina Wong in the American film Flatliners and Sasha Dixon in the television series Designated Survivor. Another notable performance was as Jasmine in "Arkangel", a Series 4 episode of the British television series Black Mirror.

Early life
Jenny Raven was born on 2 November in Hong Kong to her Chinese mother and British father.  She moved to Toronto, Ontario, Canada after graduating from Island School in Hong Kong, and graduated from the University of Toronto with a Bachelor of Science in Criminology and psychology.

Career
In 2003, Raven made her screen debut in the Cantonese-language Hong Kong film Men Suddenly in Black. After moving to Toronto, Ontario, Canada and graduating, Raven landed a leading role as Margo Dubois in the Canadian children's comedy TV series Majority Rules! for 26 episodes from 2009 to 2011. Raven worked alongside Juno Temple and Rhys Ifans in the American independent comedy-drama film Len and Company, which had its North American premiere at the 2015 Toronto International Film Festival. Raven has made single-episode appearances in numerous TV shows such as Lost Girl (2010), The L.A. Complex (2012), Private Eyes (2016), Shadowhunters and Good Witch (2017).

In 2017, Raven appeared as Irina Wong in Flatliners, a remake of the 1990 film of the same name. The same year, she appeared as Jasmine in Arkangel, an episode of Black Mirror. Raven played a recurring role as Sasha Dixon in 10 episodes of the television series Designated Survivor from 2017–2018. 

In 2018, Raven played Veronica in 6 episodes of the comedy series Wholesome Foods I Love You... Is That OK?, which went on to win 'Best International Comedy' at the British Web Awards in 2020 and 'Best Ensemble' at the Seoul Web Fest in 2019.

In 2019, Raven starred as Caine in the post-apocalyptic horror film Riot Girls. In 2020, Raven landed a guest role in the award winning comedy series Kim's Convenience as Gwen, potential love interest of Kimchee played by Andrew Phung.

In 2021, Raven played a leading role as Emily in the Adam Reider directed Canadian horror film Woodland Grey. In 2022, Raven played a leading role in the romcom television movie Love at sky Gardens. Raven stars as a barista, and her coffee spilling antics, end up starting a romance.

Filmography

Film

Television

Video games

References

External links
 
 Jenny Raven profile
 Jenny Raven - Designated Survivor, selected scenes by Vimeopro
 Jenny Raven Interview

Living people
21st-century Hong Kong actresses
Hong Kong film actresses
Hong Kong television actresses
Year of birth missing (living people)